Gustavo Busatto (born 23 October 1990) is a Brazilian professional footballer who plays as a goalkeeper for Bulgarian First League club CSKA Sofia.

He began his career with Grêmio, from whom he had loan spells with ASA and Icasa before joining América-RN permanently in 2015. Then he spent time with Atlético Goianiense, Aparecidense, Polish club Podbeskidzie Bielsko-Biała, Náutico, Sampaio Corrêa and Ituano.

Career
Busatto began his career in Grêmio's academy, where in 2010 he was promoted to the first team squad of the club to compete in Campeonato Gaúcho. However, he did not play any competitive match.

In 2011, he was loaned to ASA to play in the Campeonato Brasileiro Série B, but also not played any match, returning to the Grêmio.

He made his debut for Grêmio in the 2013 Campeonato Gaúcho, in a 2–0 away win against Esportivo. However, he played only more six matches until 2014. In August of that same year, Busatto was loaned to Icasa until the end of the year to compete in the Série B. His contract with Grêmio also ends at the end of 2014. 

Busatto joined Bulgarian club CSKA Sofia in June 2019.

Career statistics

Honours
Grêmio
Campeonato Brasileiro Sub-20: 2009
Campeonato Gaúcho: 2010

CSKA Sofia
 Bulgarian Cup: 2020–21

References

External links
Gustavo Busatto at ZeroZero

1990 births
Living people
Brazilian footballers
Association football goalkeepers
Campeonato Brasileiro Série A players
Campeonato Brasileiro Série B players
Campeonato Brasileiro Série C players
Campeonato Brasileiro Série D players
First Professional Football League (Bulgaria) players
Grêmio Foot-Ball Porto Alegrense players
Associação Desportiva Recreativa e Cultural Icasa players
PFC CSKA Sofia players
Brazilian expatriate footballers
Brazilian expatriate sportspeople in Poland
Expatriate footballers in Poland
Brazilian expatriate sportspeople in Bulgaria
Expatriate footballers in Bulgaria